Sergio Álvarez Mata (born 19 July 1962) is a Mexican politician affiliated with the PAN. As of 2013 he served as Senator of the LX and LXI Legislatures of the Mexican Congress representing Morelos. He also served as Deputy during the LIX Legislature.

See also
 List of people from Morelos, Mexico

References

1962 births
Living people
People from Cuernavaca
Members of the Senate of the Republic (Mexico)
Members of the Chamber of Deputies (Mexico)
National Action Party (Mexico) politicians
21st-century Mexican politicians
Politicians from Morelos
Universidad Autónoma del Estado de Morelos alumni
Universidad Anáhuac México alumni
Members of the Congress of Morelos